The 1981 Irish Greyhound Derby took place during June and July with the final being held at Shelbourne Park in Dublin on 25 July 1981.

The winner Bold Work won £25,000 and was trained by Frank O'Regan, owned by Breda O'Regan and bred by Michael Foley. The competition was sponsored by Carrolls.

Final result 
At Shelbourne, 25 July (over 525 yards):

Distances 
½, short-head, head (lengths)

Semi finals

Competition Report
A historic 50th Irish Greyhound Derby event attracted 118 runners. The Irish challenge was headed by Produce Stakes winner Calandra Champ trained by Francie Murray and owned by Eddie Costello. The main English challenge was Upland Tiger trained by George Curtis and both hounds showed their class winning in fast times on opening night of 29.09 and 29.08 respectively.

The second round produced some controversy when Bonifacio won in 31.55, the bookmakers felt the stewards should have declared a no race because of the time and stood down for the next race. Two runners Kool Dude and Millbowe Sam broke 29 seconds winning in 28.88 and 28.96. The third round saw Cooladine Super go best in 29.06 with Upland Tiger and Calandra Champ winning once again. Bold Work was next to show his hand winning his quarter-final in 29.10 with further wins for Cooladine Super, Calandra Champ and Oran Jack.

Calandra Champ continued a faultless run to the final beating Robbie Lad by six lengths in the first semi, Moreen Rocket defeated Bold Work in the second heat and Murlens Blond and Brickyard Gem qualified from the final heat with Upland Tiger being eliminated.

In the final Calandra Champ made a poor start and after trouble at the first his challenge had ended. Bold Work led early pursued by Brickyard Gem and Robbie Lad. Bold Work held on well and came home first holding off a late challenge by Calandra Champ who had run a remarkable race to gain considerable ground.

See also
1981 UK & Ireland Greyhound Racing Year

References

1981 in Irish sport
July 1981 sports events in Europe